Königsseer Ache is a river of Bavaria, Germany. At its confluence with the Ramsauer Ache in Berchtesgaden, the Berchtesgadener Ache is formed. It passes through the lake Königssee.

See also
List of rivers of Bavaria

Rivers of Bavaria
Berchtesgadener Land
Berchtesgaden Alps
Rivers of Germany